Nicole Marie Phillips (born 23 May 1987) is an American-born Polish professional footballer who plays as a defender and a midfielder. She has been a member of the Poland women's national team. She previously played for the Chicago Red Stars and the Philadelphia Independence in the WPS, and the United States U-20 women's national soccer team.

Early life
Born in Ridgewood, New Jersey, to parents, Linda and Joseph Krzysik, Nikki attended Clifton High School in her hometown of Clifton, New Jersey. She set the school's records for goals scored in a season with 21 and career goals with 55. In 2004, she was named NSCAA High School Scholar-Athlete of the Year. She was also a  two-time Parade Magazine All-American.

University of Virginia
Krzysik attended the University of Virginia where she anchored the Cavalier defense for four seasons. As a freshman in 2005, Krzysik started all 25 games. During her junior year, she started on a defensive unit that led the nation in goals against average (0.40) and set a school record with 15 shutouts. She was named All-ACC first team twice, in 2007 and 2008. As a senior, she was named Atlantic Coast Conference Defensive Player of the Year and was a semi-finalist for the Hermann Trophy. She played every minute and led the defensive line that posted nine shutouts and allowed 5.1 shots per game. A versatile player, Krzysik scored three goals and provided three assists.

Playing career

Club

Chicago Red Stars, 2009
Krzysik was selected by the Chicago Red Stars of the WPS in the second round (13th overall) of the 2009 WPS Draft. She appeared in 14 games, making 10 starts during the 2009 season.

Philadelphia Independence, 2010–11
Krzysik was selected as the fifth overall pick by the Philadelphia Independence during the 2009 WPS Expansion Draft. She appeared in 23 games for a total of 2030 minutes during the 2010 season.

Krzysik returned to the Independence for the 2011 season and was named captain of the team after two games into the season.  She was also nominated for WPS Defender of the Year.

FC Kansas City, 2014–
Krzysik was selected as the first pick (second overall) by the Seattle Reign FC in the 2013 NWSL Supplemental Draft for the inaugural season of the NWSL; however, she opted not to play. In 2013, her player rights were traded to FC Kansas City.

International
Krzysik represented the United States at the U-16, U-1, U-21, U-23 levels. She played for the United States at the 2004 U-19 and 2006 U-20 World Championships and was instrumental in the United States winning the 2006 CONCACAF U-20 Final Women's Qualifying Tournament. In 2008, she made 11 starts for the United States U-23 women's national soccer team.

Krzysik made her first appearance for Poland in the fall of 2013.

Personal life
She married John Phillips in 2013.

References

External links

 
 FC Kansas City player profile
 US Soccer player profile
 Chicago Red Stars player profile
 W-League player profile
 Virginia player profile
 

1987 births
Living people
Polish women's footballers
Women's association football defenders
Women's association football midfielders
Poland women's international footballers
American women's soccer players
Women's Professional Soccer players
Chicago Red Stars players
Virginia Cavaliers women's soccer players
Clifton High School (New Jersey) alumni
Sportspeople from Clifton, New Jersey
People from Ridgewood, New Jersey
Philadelphia Independence players
USL W-League (1995–2015) players
New York Fury players
Women's Premier Soccer League Elite players
National Women's Soccer League players
FC Kansas City players
American people of Polish descent
Citizens of Poland through descent
Polish people of American descent
United States women's under-20 international soccer players
OL Reign draft picks